The Seefelder Aach is a river in the districts of Sigmaringen and Bodenseekreis, Tübingen region, southern Baden-Württemberg, Germany. It is approximately 55 kilometres long and flows into Lake Constance. It has a catchment area of 279 km² and is part of the Rhine river system. It starts as Salemer Aach and becomes the Seefelder Aach after the conjunction with the Deggenhauser Aach, further down from Salem. The upper part – near Aach-Linz – it is also colloquially called Linzer Aach or Hintere Aach.

References

Rivers of Baden-Württemberg
Tributaries of Lake Constance
Rivers of Germany